The Nest was a 2008 Australian television series that explores adult children living with their parents. and offers insights into what a family means. Throughout the series, a financial expert and a relationship expert provided the families with guidance and support.

A second series began airing on SBS One in September 2009. The second series focuses on work/life family balance with three families who are workaholics and don't spend enough time with their kids. The series also examines long working hours. Performance expert Andrew May provides the families with revised family schedules.

External links
 Freehand Productions

References

2000s Australian documentary television series
Special Broadcasting Service original programming
Television series by Freehand Productions